Mihaela Rodica Popescu Bitănescu (born 8 August 1938 in Răsuceni, Ilfov County, Romania) is a Romanian actress. Currently, she works in the National Theatre of Bucharest.

Filmography
Ministerul comediei (1999)
Cu materialul clientului (1997)
Harababura (1990)
Coana Chirita (1986)
Aripi de zapada (1985)
Casatorie cu repetitie (1985)
Secretul lui Nemesis (1985)
Colierul de turcoaze (1985)
Sosesc pasarile calatoare (1984)
Femeia din Ursa Mare (1982)
Am o idee (1981)
Dumbrava minunata (1980)
Premiul întîi (1979)
Iarba verde de acasa (1978)
Ciocolata cu alune (1978)
Eu, tu si Ovidiu (1977)
Avocatul (1976) (TV)
Patima (1975)
Taticul (1974) (TV)
Originea si evolutia vehiculelor (1973)

External links

Romanian actresses
1938 births
Living people